Border Phantom is a 1937 American Western film directed by S. Roy Luby and written by Fred Myton. The film stars Bob Steele, Harley Wood, Don Barclay, Karl Hackett, Horace Murphy, and Miki Morita. The film was released on June 7, 1937, by Republic Pictures.

Plot
The plot is built around Cowboy Larry O'Day, his sidekick Lucky Smith and Barbara Hartwell, the latter is about to be arrested for the murder of her uncle, while she is arrested Larry and Lucky go on a journey to find the real murderer that involves people smuggling of Chinese women.

Cast
Bob Steele as Larry O'Day
Harley Wood as Barbara Hartwell
Don Barclay as Lucky Smith
Karl Hackett as Obed Young
Horace Murphy as Sheriff
Miki Morita as Chan Lee
Perry Murdock as Jim Barton
John S. Peters as Dr. Von Kurtz 
Frank Ball as Professor Andrew Hartwell

References

External links
 

1937 films
American Western (genre) films
1937 Western (genre) films
Republic Pictures films
American black-and-white films
Films directed by S. Roy Luby
1930s English-language films
1930s American films
Works about human trafficking
Works about sex trafficking
Human trafficking in the United States
Films about human trafficking in the United States